Murzinowatsoniia is a monotypic moth genus in the subfamily Arctiinae erected by Vladimir Viktorovitch Dubatolov in 2003. Its only species, Murzinowatsonia x-album, was first described by Charles Oberthür in 1911. It is known from the Chinese provinces of Sichuan and Yunnan.

References

  (2003). "Three new genera of Chinese Arctiinae (Lepidoptera, Arctiidae)". Tinea. 17 (5): 255-265, Tokyo.
  (1911). [no name]. Études de Lépidoptèrologie comparée. 5 (1): 323, 335-337, pl. 66, 82-83, Rennes.

Spilosomina
Monotypic moth genera
Moths of Asia